Don't Panic Chaps! is a 1959 British comedy film directed by George Pollock and starring Dennis Price, George Cole, Thorley Walters and Terence Alexander. The film was produced by Teddy Baird for ACT Films. Originally called Carry On Chaps, the title was changed following the success of the "Carry On" series.

It was based on a radio play and was made for £75,000. It was shot at Walton Studios. The film's sets were designed by the art director Scott MacGregor.

Plot
The film starts just after the Battle of El Alamein  somewhere in North Africa. British troops train in enemy plane and ship recognition. They train to operate an inflatable dinghy and are then taken by submarine to an Adriatic island. After setting up camp they discover that the island is the base for a small unit of Germans when one of the British soldiers bumps into a German soldier while both are skinny dipping in the sea.

The British soldiers hunt for the Germans and find a former monastery where they are surprised by a German officer. He explains that his group were guarding stores for re-supplying German submarines but have been forgotten by their superiors and offers to share his supplies and accommodation if the British will agree to a truce. The British soldiers return to their camp to consider the offer and eventually agree to accept when they realise that their food and water are about to run out. They join the Germans at the monastery but both the British NCO Bolter and the German NCO Meister disagree.

The two sides live harmoniously and even find mutual interests, with Finch befriending a German archaeologist and helping on an archaeological dig. One day, while sunbathing, the British officer Brown sees a woman, Elsa, in the sea clinging to some wreckage. He is unable to swim and calls to his men to help him but they ignore his calls. Eventually he jumps in the sea but has to be rescued by the woman. The soldiers talk to her and discover that she is Slavic, and doesn't understand English, French or German. Finally Finch tries Italian and is able to communicate with her. Much hilarity ensues as the soldiers vie for her attention.

The two NCOs are mutually hostile, and eventually leave the monastery for a fist fight. When they are too exhausted to continue, they realise that they both agree that their duty as a soldier is to return to their own army so that they can continue fighting. They agree to take the inflatable dinghy and return to the war. However they are unable to overcome the current and are forced to return to the island.

When the British are eventually rescued by submarine, Elsa runs to the beach and signals that she wants to go with them, and she gladly joins Finch. The Germans, thinking they are to return to their lives of idleness in the Adriatic, immediately see a German  submarine surface and resign themselves to being rescued from their island haven in order to have the glory of being transferred to the Eastern Front.

Cast
 Dennis Price as Krisling
 George Cole as Finch
 Thorley Walters as Brown
 Nadja Regin as Elsa
 Harry Fowler as Ackroyd
 Percy Herbert as Bolter
 George Murcell as Meister
 Nicholas Phipps as Mortimer
 Terence Alexander as Babbington
 Gertan Klauber as Schmidt
 Thomas Foulkes as Voss

References

1959 films
1950s war comedy films
British war comedy films
Films directed by George Pollock
Films set on islands
Films set in the Mediterranean Sea
Military humor in film
1959 comedy films
Films shot at Nettlefold Studios
Columbia Pictures films
Hammer Film Productions films
British World War II films
1950s English-language films
1950s British films